Stupido hotel is the thirteenth studio album by Italian singer-songwriter Vasco Rossi, released on 6 April 2001. It was preceded by the single "Siamo soli". The album was produced by Guido Elmi.

Track listing

Charts

Peak positions

Year-end charts

Certifications and sales

References

2001 albums
Italian-language albums
Vasco Rossi albums